The law of Bolivia includes a constitution and a number of codes.

Constitution

Bolivia has had seventeen constitutions.

Sources
By 1840, sources of the law of Bolivia included: (1) Acts of the Peru-Bolivian Confederation, prior to the revolution of Bolivia. (2) Acts of the legislature of the Republic. Among these Acts there was a general code of laws, entitled Codigo Santa Cruz. This title is evidently in imitation of the title of Code Napoleon; for Santa Cruz is the name of the general who was elected president of the Republic in 1828; and under his presidency, the Codigo was published. (3) Decisions of the Bolivian courts. (4) Spanish law. (5) Roman civil law. (6) The ancient Peruvian law, or the customs and usages of the country.

Legislation
The legislature has been called the Congreso Nacional. The gazette is called Gaceta Oficial de Bolivia.

List of legislation

Spanish Criminal Code of 1822
Penal Code of 1834
Mining Law of 13 October 1880
Rules for the application of the Mining Law of 28 October 1882
Law of 3 September 1883
Code of Criminal Procedure of 6 August 1898
Penal Code of 23 August 1972 (Decree Law No 10426) 
Code of Criminal Procedure of 1972
Commercial Code of 25 February 1977 (Decree Law No 14379) 
Supreme Decree 21060 of 29 August 1985
Law of 13 April 1992 on copyright
Law No 1768 of 10 March 1997 
Law No 2494 of 4 August 2003
Law Against Racism 2010
Law of the Rights of Mother Earth (No 71 of 2010)
Framework Law of Mother Earth and Integral Development for Living Well (No 300 of 2012)

Courts and judiciary
Courts have included the Plurinational Constitutional Court, the Supreme Court of Justice and the Tribunal Supremo Electoral

Criminal law

The Spanish Criminal Code of 1822 came into force in Bolivia on 2 April 1831. It was replaced by the Penal Code of 1834. A Law of 3 September 1883 made provision in relation to perjury. Bolivia now has a new Penal Code of 23 August 1972.

There was a Code of Criminal Procedure of 6 August 1898. This was replaced by the Code of Criminal Procedure of 1972.

Copyright

As to copyright, see the law of 13 April 1992.

Mining
In 1892, the mining laws of Bolivia consisted of the Ley de mineria (Mining Law) promulgated on the 13 October 1880, and the Reglamento de la ley de mineria (Rules for the application of the Mining Law) made on the 28 October 1882. The International Bureau of the American Republics said that the "provisions of the Ley de mineria are simple and wise. They are contained in no more than twenty-seven articles and leave little room for casuistics or embarrassing technicalities."

See also
Law enforcement in Bolivia

References
Bolivia. Guide to Law Online. Law Library of Congress.
Bolivia. WorldLII.
Helen Lord Clagett. A Guide to the Law and Legal Literature of Bolivia. Library of Congress. Washington. 1947. (Latin American series, no 12). HathiTrust. Google Books:   . Reprinted by Gordon Press, New York, 1981. See also (1981) 13 Lawyer of the Americas 599 
"American Law - 1. Bolivia" (1840) 20 Legal Observer 323 et seq
International Bureau of the American Republics. Bolivia: Geographical Sketch, Natural Resources, Laws, Economic Conditions, Actual development, Prospects of Future Growth. Government Printing Office. Washington. 1904. Internet Archive
A D Garman. Mining Laws of Bolivia. (Information Circular, volume 6140). U.S. Dept. of Commerce, Bureau of Mines. 1929. Google Books
International Bureau of the American Republics. "Bolivia". Mines and Mining Laws of Latin America. US Government Printing Office. 1892. Page 16 et seq. Google Books
Enrique Mallea Balboa. La Legislación Minera: Colección Completa de Leyes, Reglamentos, Decretos, Resoluciones, Ordenes y demás disposiciones concernientes á la adjudicación de las minas. "El Nacional" de I.V. Villa. 1901. Internet Archive
George A Makinson and Dayle C McDonough. Consignment Laws of Chile and Bolivia. (Trade Information Bulletin, volume 134). United States. Bureau of Foreign and Domestic Commerce. Government Printing Office. 1923. Google Books
Anna-Stina Ericson. Labor Law and Practice in Bolivia. United States Bureau of Labor Statistics. 1962. Google Books
William Francis Delaney. ". . . Bolivia and Paraguay". Reinsurance Laws of South America and Mexico. Insurance Society of New York. 1943. Page 29 et seq. Google Books.
Cecilia Medina Quiroga. The Legal status of Indians in Bolivia. Institute for the Development of Indian Law. 1977. Google Books
Carlos Walter Urquidi. A Statement of the Laws of Bolivia in Matters Affecting Business. General Secretariat, Organization of American States. 1974.
An Overview of Bolivia's Law of Popular Participation. Center for Latin American Studies, San Diego State University. Latin American Studies Student Organization. 1998. Google Books
Ley de la organización judicial. 1863. Google Books
Colección Oficial de Leyes, Decretos, Ordenes, & de la Republica Boliviana Anos 1825 y 1826. Imprenta Artistica: Socabaya No 20. La Paz, Bolivia. Google Books
Colección Oficial de Leyes, Decretos, Ordenes, Resoluciones &c que se han expidido para el regimen de la Republica Boliviana. Collegia de Artes for Bernadino Palacios. 1834. Google Books 
Colección Oficial de Leyes, Decretos, Ordenes, Resoluciones Supremas que se han expidido para el regimen de la Republica Boliviana. Lopez. 1857. Google Books
Waltraud Q Morales. A Brief History of Bolivia. Second Edition. Facts on File, Infobase Publishing. 2010. Page 278 et seq.

Law of Bolivia